Boundiali Department is a department of Bagoué Region in Savanes District, Ivory Coast. In 2021, its population was 198,541 and its seat is the settlement of Boundiali. The sub-prefectures of the department are Baya, Boundiali, Ganaoni, Kasséré, and Siempurgo.

History

Boundiali Department was created in 1969 as one of the 24 new departments that were created to take the place of the six departments that were being abolished. It was created from territory that was formerly part of Nord Department. Using current boundaries as a reference, from 1969 to 1980 the department occupied the same territory as Bagoué Region.

In 1980, Boundiali Department was divided to create Tengréla Department. In 1997, regions were introduced as new first-level subdivisions of Ivory Coast; as a result, all departments were converted into second-level subdivisions. Boundiali Department was included as part of Savanes Region.

Boundiali Department was split again in 2008 to create Kouto Department.

In 2011, districts were introduced as new first-level subdivisions of Ivory Coast. At the same time, regions were reorganised and became second-level subdivisions and all departments were converted into third-level subdivisions. At this time, Boundiali Department became part of Bagoué Region in Savanes District.

Notes

Departments of Bagoué
1969 establishments in Ivory Coast
States and territories established in 1969